Carlo Landriani (1807–1875) was an Italian painter active in Lombardy painting historic and sacred subjects.

References

19th-century Italian painters
Italian male painters
1807 births
1875 deaths
19th-century Italian male artists